The 2010 AFC Women's Championship qualification saw twelve nations attempt to qualify for the 2010 AFC Women's Asian Cup football competition.  The three winners of the second round groups joined five automatic qualifiers in the finals tournament held in China in May 2010.

This tournament also served as the first stage of qualification for the 2011 FIFA Women's World Cup for the Asian zone.

First round
The six lowest ranked teams played the first round. Myanmar, Chinese Taipei, Thailand, Iran, Vietnam and Hong Kong had a bye to the second round. Bangladesh withdrew before the start of qualification.

All matches were played in Kuala Lumpur, Malaysia.

Second round

Group A
All matches were played in Hsinying City, Chinese Taipei.

Group B
All matches were played in Bangkok, Thailand.

Group C
''All matches were played in Ho Chi Minh City, Vietnam.

2010 qualification
Asian
qualification
2009 in Asian football